{{DISPLAYTITLE:C12H10}}
The molecular formula C12H10 may refer to:

Acenaphthene
Benzocyclooctatetraene
Biphenyl
1,3,5,7,9-Cyclododecapentaen-11-yne
Dodecatetrayne
Elassovalene
Ethenylnaphthalene
1-Ethenylnaphthalene
2-Ethenylnaphthalene
Heptalene
Sesquifulvalene